Absamat Masaliyevich Masaliyev (romanised: Absamat Masaliyevich (Masalı uulu) Masaliyev, ; 10 April 1933, Alysh, Osh oblast, Kyrgyz SSR – 31 July 2004, Bishkek) was the first Secretary of the Central Committee of the Communist Party of Kirghizia from November 1985 until Kyrgyz independence, and led the Party of Communists of Kyrgyzstan afterwards.

History 
He began studies at the Mining Technical School in southern Kirghizia in 1953. Three years later, he moved to the Moscow Mining Institute. He started his career as a deputy chief engineer at Kyzyl-Kiya coal mine in the south of Kirghizia.

In 1961 Masaliyev became an instructor at the regional branch of the Communist Party of Kirghizia in Osh. He worked his way up the ranks until he became First Secretary of the Central Committee of the Communist Party of Kirghizia in November 1985. From 10 April to 10 December 1990 he served as chairman of the Supreme Soviet of the Kirghiz Soviet Socialist Republic.

Masaliyev was a deputy of the Soviet of Nationalities of the Supreme Soviet of the USSR in its 10th to 11th convocations, from 1979 to 1989.

Apas Jumagulov and Absamat Masaliyev were the two original candidates for Kyrgyz Presidency on 25 October 1990, but neither could get the majority of votes, so the Supreme Soviet chose Askar Akayev to be the first president on 27 October 1990. Masaliyev was a candidate at 1995 presidential elections, losing to Akayev again. He held a seat in the Assembly of People's Representatives of the Supreme Council from 1995 until his death of a heart attack in 2004.

References

External links 
 Absamat Masaliyev at Radio Free Europe

1933 births
2004 deaths
People from Osh Region
First secretaries of the Communist Party of Kirghizia
Members of the Assembly of People's Representatives of Kyrgyzstan
Party of Communists of Kyrgyzstan politicians
Heroes of the Kyrgyz Republic
Tenth convocation members of the Soviet of Nationalities
Eleventh convocation members of the Soviet of Nationalities
Moscow State Mining University alumni